Asaia krungthepensis is a species of acetic acid bacterium first isolated from a Heliconia flower. Its type strain is AA08T (=BCC 12978T =TISTR 1524T =NBRC 100057T =NRIC 0535T).

References

Further reading

Sjamsuridzal, Wellyzar. Forkomikro Catalogue of Cultures of Indonesian Microorganisms. Yayasan Obor Indonesia, 2008. 

Zchori-Fein, Einat, and Kostas Bourtzis, eds. Manipulative tenants: bacteria associated with arthropods. CRC Press, 2011.

External links

LPSN
Type strain of Asaia krungthepensis at BacDive -  the Bacterial Diversity Metadatabase

Rhodospirillales
Bacteria described in 2004